Brian William Lloyd (born 18 March 1948) is a Welsh former footballer who played as a goalkeeper. He played 545 times in the Football League for five clubs and was capped three times by the Welsh national team.

He began his professional career at Stockport County in 1967, having signed from Rhyl. He transferred to Southend United two years later, before ending up at Wrexham in 1971. He spent six years as the Welsh club's first choice keeper, before he was sold to Chester City. In 1981, he was loaned out to Port Vale, before he re-signed for Stockport County. He left the Football League in 1983, and later spent some years in Welsh football with Bangor City, Colwyn Bay, Rhyl, and Lex XI. He won Player of the Year awards at both Wrexham and Chester City.

Club career
Lloyd began his career playing non-league football with Rhyl, where he played a handful of games before joining Jimmy Meadows's Stockport County for £1,000 in March 1967. The "Hatters" won the Fourth Division title in 1966–67. The club maintained a secure mid-table position in the Third Division in 1967–68 and 1968–69. He also played one game on loan at Northern Premier League side Macclesfield Town in 1968. After 32 league appearances for Stockport he moved to Southend United in September 1969 for £10,000. The "Shrimpers" finished 17th in the Fourth Division in 1969–70 and then 18th in 1970–71, hovering above the re-election zone under the stewardship of first Geoff Hudson and then Arthur Rowley.

Lloyd departed Roots Hall and returned to North Wales in August 1971, beginning a long stint with John Neal's Wrexham. Lloyd played 35 games in his first season at the Racecourse Ground and was then ever-present in league games in the next five years, as the club challenged for promotion from Third Division. The "Dragons" finished 12th in 1972–73, before finishing one place and five points behind the promotion places in 1973–74. Wrexham dropped to 13th in 1974–75, before rising to sixth in 1975–76, just three places and four points outside of the promotion places. Lloyd was the club's first winner of the Jack Williams Player of the Season accolade in 1975–76. The club again narrowly missed out on automatic promotion in 1976–77, finishing just one point behind third-placed Crystal Palace.

In September 1977, Lloyd made a surprise £6,000 move to local rivals Chester. He quickly replaced fellow Welshman Grenville Millington as the regular Chester goalkeeper and helped Alan Oakes's "Seals" to finish fifth in the Third Division in 1977–78, with Lloyd being named as the club's player of the season for his efforts. He was again first-choice the following season but an injury in September 1979 led to Millington replacing Lloyd in the Chester goal. With Millington now the regular in goal and youngster Phil Harrington emerging from the youth ranks, Lloyd was allowed to join Port Vale on loan in February 1981. He played Vale's remaining sixteen matches of the season. Vale supporters and players alike appealed to manager John McGrath to sign him on permanently at Vale Park, but to no avail, he returned to Sealand Road and was subsequently released.

Ahead of the start of the following season Lloyd was back at Stockport County, who were now managed by Jimmy McGuigan. He missed just one game in two seasons back at Edgeley Park, and even managed to get on the scoresheet against Bradford City in 1982. County hovered above the Fourth Division re-election zone in 1981–82 and 1982–83 under the stewardship of Eric Webster. Lloyd dropped into non-league football, having spells with North Wales sides Bangor City (Alliance Premier League and Northern Premier League), Colwyn Bay (North West Counties League), Rhyl and Lex XI.

International career
Lloyd was capped three times by Wales in matches against Austria, England and Scotland, having twice previously played for the Welsh under 23s.

Post-retirement
After retiring as a footballer, Lloyd became a self-employed design consultant in Wrexham, a career he had initially begun after leaving school. He has won awards for his architectural work.

Career statistics

Club statistics
Source:

International statistics

Honours
Individual
Wrexham A.F.C. Player of the Year: 1975–76
Chester City F.C. Player of the Year:  1977–78

Stockport County
Football League Fourth Division: 1966–67

References

1948 births
Sportspeople from St Asaph
Living people
Association football goalkeepers
Welsh footballers
Wales under-23 international footballers
Wales international footballers
Rhyl F.C. players
Stockport County F.C. players
Southend United F.C. players
Wrexham A.F.C. players
Chester City F.C. players
Port Vale F.C. players
Bangor City F.C. players
Colwyn Bay F.C. players
Lex XI F.C. players
English Football League players
National League (English football) players
Northern Premier League players
Welsh designers